The 2008–09 FA Youth Cup was the 57th FA Youth Cup. A record 474 clubs participated in the competition. The competition started in September 2008 with the preliminary round and concluded with the final on 22 and 26 May 2009.

Arsenal knocked out holders Manchester City en route to the final, where they beat 2006 and 2007 winners Liverpool 6–2 on aggregate to lift the FA Youth Cup for the 7th time.

Calendar 
Qualifying ties played in the week commencing; proper ties played by the closing date.

First round
The League One and League Two teams will enter at this round except Notts County which did not apply, along with the winners of the previous round.

Second round
The winners from the first round matches will progress to second round.

Third round
The 20 Premier League and 24 Championship teams enter at this stage, along with the winners of the second round.

Fourth round

Fifth round

Quarter-finals

Semi-finals

First leg

Second leg

Arsenal won 6–2 on aggregate.

Liverpool won 6–1 on aggregate.

Final

First leg

Second leg

Arsenal won 6–2 on aggregate.

See also
2008–09 Premier Academy League
2008–09 Premier Reserve League
2008–09 FA Cup
2008–09 in English football

References

External links
The FA Youth Cup at The Football Association official website

2008–09 domestic association football cups
2008–09 in English football
2008-09